Acedera is a Spanish municipality in the province of Badajoz, Extremadura. It has a population of 842 (2007) and an area of 82.5 km².

References

Municipalities in the Province of Badajoz